Henry Clifford, 5th Earl of Cumberland (28 February 159211 December 1643) was an English landowner and politician who sat in the House of Commons between 1614 and 1622. He was created a baron in 1628 and succeeded to the title Earl of Cumberland in 1641.

Clifford was the son of Francis Clifford, 4th Earl of Cumberland and Grisold Hughes and a member of the Clifford family which held the seat of Skipton from 1310 to 1676. He was educated at Christ Church, Oxford. In 1607 he became joint Lord Lieutenant of Cumberland, Northumberland and Westmorland. He was elected Member of Parliament for Westmorland in 1614, and was returned in 1621. In 1621 he became Custos Rotulorum of Westmorland. He was created Baron Clifford in 1628.

Clifford was a supporter of Charles I during the so-called Bishops' Wars in Scotland, and also during the Civil War until his death. He succeeded to the title of Earl of Cumberland in 1641 and died two years later in 1643 at the age of 52; as he left no sons the earldom became extinct.

Clifford married Lady Frances Cecil (159314 February 1644), daughter of Robert Cecil, 1st Earl of Salisbury and Elizabeth Brooke on 25 July, 1610, at St Mary Abbots Church, Kensington. They had one child: Lady Elizabeth Clifford who married Richard Boyle, 1st Earl of Burlington.

References

|-

|- 

|-

|-

 

|-

5
01
Henry
Peers of England created by Charles I
Lord-Lieutenants of Cumberland
Lord-Lieutenants of Northumberland
Lord-Lieutenants of Westmorland
1592 births
1643 deaths
English MPs 1614
English MPs 1621–1622